German submarine U-717 was a Type VIIC U-boat of Nazi Germany's Kriegsmarine during World War II. The submarine was laid down on 24 April 1942 at the H. C. Stülcken Sohn yard at Hamburg, launched on 20 February 1943, and commissioned on 19 May 1943 under the command of Oberleutnant zur See Siegfried von Rothkirch und Panthen. Attached to 5th U-boat Flotilla based at Kiel, U-717 completed her training period on 31 July 1944 and was assigned to front-line service.

Design
German Type VIIC submarines were preceded by the shorter Type VIIB submarines. U-717 had a displacement of  when at the surface and  while submerged. She had two shafts and two  propellers.

U-717 was fitted with five  torpedo tubes (four fitted at the bow and one at the stern), fourteen torpedoes, one  SK C/35 naval gun, 220 rounds, and two twin  C/30 anti-aircraft guns. The boat had a complement of between forty-four and sixty.

Service history
In the last days of World War II, U-717 was scuttled with other U-boats during Operation Regenbogen in Flensburg Firth on 5 May 1945 in position .

References

Bibliography

External links

World War II submarines of Germany
German Type VIIC submarines
1943 ships
Ships built in Hamburg
U-boats commissioned in 1943
Operation Regenbogen (U-boat)
Maritime incidents in May 1945
World War II shipwrecks in the Atlantic Ocean